Hugh Whistler (28 September 1889 – 7 July 1943), F.Z.S., M.B.O.U. was an English police officer and ornithologist who worked in India. He wrote one of the first field guides to Indian birds and documented the distributions of birds in notes in several journals apart from describing new subspecies.

Life and career
Hugh was the first son of Major Fuller Whistler of the Highland Light Infantry and Gwenllian Annie (née Robinson) and was born at Mablethorpe in 1889. Whistler was educated at Aldenham School. His younger brother Ralfe Allen Fuller Whistler (24 July 1895 - 28 April 1917) followed after his father and joined the Highland Light Infantry while Hugh went to serve with the Indian police mainly in the Punjab.

He served in India from December 1909 to April 1926. He was initially posted at Phillaur but was later to serve across Punjab including districts such as Jhang that were considered unpopular. He was posted in other regions including Kangra, Lahul and Spiti. He began to correspond with Claud Buchanan Ticehurst and, when on leave in England in 1910, he visited Grove House at Lowestoft and was introduced to scientific ornithology. Wherever he was posted, he took an interest in the local birdlife, keeping careful notes and making collections. In 1924 he returned to England and made a trip to Spain with Ticehurst.

On 2 October 1925 Whistler married Margaret Joan Ashton (1893–1981) daughter of Thomas Gair Ashton, 1st Baron Ashton of Hyde and Eva Margaret James who were from near his own home in Battle. He died on 7 July 1943 leaving behind a daughter Benedicta (now deceased) and son Ralfe.

Ornithology
Whistler studied and collected birds wherever he was posted in India. On retiring to England he continued his research into Indian ornithology. He published extensively in the Journal of the Bombay Natural History Society, making notes on the occurrence and on the distributions of geographic plumage variations. He published a ten-part introduction to the study of birds in India. He made collecting trips to Spain, Albania, Italy and Algeria often in the company of Claud Buchanan Ticehurst.

Around 1925 a plan was made by W S Millard, Sir George Lowndes and F J Mitchell to produce an illustrated guide to the birds of India for beginners. Whistler was asked to help in its writing. It was eventually published in 1928 as the Popular Handbook of Indian Birds. Four later editions of this publication were issued, and the last was published after his death. In this work he foresaw the value of popularizing observation-based ornithology:

Whistler lived at Battle, East Sussex during his retirement, where he was a Justice of the Peace. He made one trip to India in 1928 as a guest of Admiral Hubert Lynes with the intention of studying the birds of Kashmir. Lynes was recalled to England and insisted that Whistler and Bertram Beresford Osmaston complete the bird survey. He joined the British Ornithologists' Union in 1913 and in 1940 served as its as vice-president. He visited Kashmir with Admiral Lynes and wanted to produce an account of the birds of Punjab and Kashmir; this was not completed.

He was also interested in hounds, pheasant rearing, falconry and was an antiquarian. He was for a while involved in the care of Bodiam Castle. Whistler was a very careful and critical observer noted for his "capacity for taking pains".

He was skeptical of George Bristow and his observations which was later to become famous as the Hastings Rarities scandal. Whistler was critical of egg collection driven by trade and remarked on the unscrupulous collection that he heard of from a correspondent in the Khasi hills. He further remarked that eggs from Assam or Sikkim be treated with caution by oologists. This article was reacted to by E C Stuart Baker.

Several subspecies of birds were named after him including some by Ticehurst, Delacour and Stresemann. Whistler's warbler originally described as Seicercus burkii whistleri is now considered a full species: Seicercus whistleri. The Whistler Prize of Sussex University, awarded to the best essay on natural history or archaeology, is named after him. His collection of 17,320 bird skins was presented to the Natural History Museum by Mrs Whistler in 1949.

Writings
A partial list of Whistler's writings includes:
 

 (Edition 3 (1941))
 Whistler H (1944) The Avifaunal Survey of Ceylon conducted jointly by the British and Colombo Museums. Spolia Zeylanica 23: 119–321. (posthumous)

References

1889 births
1943 deaths
English ornithologists
Fellows of the Zoological Society of London
People from Mablethorpe
20th-century British zoologists
Members of the Bombay Natural History Society